Ruick is a surname. Notable people with the surname include:

 Barbara Ruick (1932–1974), American actress and singer
 Melville Ruick (1898–1972), American actor, father of Barbara

See also
 Rick (disambiguation)